Tor putitora, the Putitor mahseer, Himalayan mahseer, or golden mahseer, is an endangered species of cyprinid fish that is found in rapid streams, riverine pools, and lakes in the Himalayan region. Its native range is within the basins of the Indus, Ganges and Brahmaputra rivers.
The official IGFA (International Game Fishing Association) All-Tackle World Record is 29.94kg (66lb),  caught by British angler - Greg Iszatt from the Mahakali River in June 2017. Greg Iszatt was assisted by mahseer guide - Christopher Oldmeadow. It is threatened by habitat loss, habitat degradation and overfishing, and it already has declined by more than an estimated 50%.

Its caudal, pelvic, and anal fins show tint of reddish-golden colour. While the body above its lateral line is generally golden in colour at adulthood, the gold colour might be absent in young specimens.
Hamilton's original description says "The head is blunt, oval, small, and smooth". He goes on to say "The mouth is small" and "the lateral line is scarcely distinguishable". However, the largest head of any mahseer species, with a large mouth and prominent lateral line stripe, are features considered to be important in the correct identification of this species. A cavefish species found in Meghalaya in India is likely derived from this species.

The Himalayan Golden Mahaseer is the National fish of Pakistan.. It is also the state fish of the states of Arunachal Pradesh, Himachal Pradesh, Uttarakhand, Madhyapradesh and the UT of Jammu and Kashmir.

Nobel Prize Winner for Literature - Rudyard Kipling,  wrote: "There he stood, the mahseer of the Poonch, beside whom the tarpon is a herring, and he who catches him can say he is a fisherman.” ( Rudyard Kipling -  "The Day's Work"  1898  - "The Brushwood Boy" 1899 ).

Releases beyond native range 
Recent releases of artificially bred stock have been into the Irrawaddy River basin in Nagaland, India and, through the Indo-German Biodiversity Programme  releases into the Hira Bambai reservoir and small streams around Melghat Tiger Reserve, part of the Tapti River basin. The effect of releasing fish from a different river basin, well outside its native range is uncertain. That these fish are being released over a ten-year period, with as many as 10,000 in each batch, must be considered a huge threat to the native mahseer and other fish species.
According to Dr Ogale, former scientist leading the fish breeding programme for Tata Power: 
"When these mature, there will be more fingerlings which will be then introduced in river Tapi".
River Tapi is a west-flowing river of the central Indian state of Maharashtra.

Most researchers believe this fish is in a population decline, hence the Red Listing status of Endangered. Some, however, have noted that Tor putitora is "quite abundant", which also raises questions about the status of ongoing stock augmentation programmes.

Notes

References

Taxa named by Francis Buchanan-Hamilton
Fish described in 1822
Cyprinid fish of Asia
Freshwater fish of China
Freshwater fish of India
Symbols of Uttarakhand
Fish of Pakistan
National symbols of Pakistan